The timeline below shows the date of publication of possible major scientific breakthroughs, theories and discoveries, along with the discoverer.  This article discounts mere speculation as discovery, although imperfect reasoned arguments, arguments based on elegance/simplicity, and numerically/experimentally verified conjectures qualify (as otherwise no scientific discovery before the late 19th century would count). The timeline begins at the Bronze Age, as it is difficult to give even estimates for the timing of events prior to this, such as of the discovery of counting, natural numbers and arithmetic.

To avoid overlap with timeline of historic inventions, the timeline does not list examples of documentation for manufactured substances and devices unless they reveal a more fundamental leap in the theoretical ideas in a field.

Bronze Age
Many early innovations of the Bronze Age were prompted by the increase in trade, and this also applies to the scientific advances of this period. For context, the major civilizations of this period are Egypt, Mesopotamia, and the Indus Valley, with Greece rising in importance towards the end of the third millennium BC. It is to be noted that the Indus Valley script remains undeciphered and there are very little surviving fragments of its writing, thus any inference about scientific discoveries in the region must be made based only on archaeological digs.

Mathematics

Numbers, measurement and arithmetic

 Around 3000 BC: Units of measurement are developed in the Americas as well as the major Bronze Age civilisations: Egypt, Mesopotamia, Elam and the Indus Valley. 
 The oldest extant record of a unit of length, being the  2650 BCE, Sumerian city, Nippur (present day Iraq), cubit-rod ruler.
 The oldest attested evidence for the existence of units of weight, and weighing scales date to the Fourth Dynasty of Egypt, with Deben (unit) balance weights, from the reign of Sneferu (c. 2600 BC) excavated, though earlier usage has been proposed.
The Indus Valley may have been the major innovator on this, as the first measurement devices were invented in Lothal in Gujarat, India.
 1800 BC: Fractions were first studied by the Egyptians in their study of Egyptian fractions.

Geometry and trigonometry
 2100 BC: The concept of area is first recognised in Babylonian clay tablets, and 3-dimensional volume is discussed in an Egyptian papyrus. This begins the study of geometry.
 Early 2nd millennium BC: Similar triangles and side-ratios are studied in Egypt (e.g. in the Rhind Mathematical Papyrus, a copy of an older Middle Kingdom text) for the construction of pyramids, paving the way for the field of trigonometry.

Algebra
 2100 BC: Quadratic equations, in the form of problems relating the areas and sides of rectangles, are solved by Babylonians.

Number theory and discrete mathematics
 2000 BC: Pythagorean triples are first discussed in Babylon and Egypt, and appear on later manuscripts such as the Berlin Papyrus 6619.

Numerical mathematics and algorithms
 2000 BC: Multiplication tables in Babylon.
 1800 BC – 1600 BC: A numerical approximation for the square root of two, accurate to 6 decimal places, is recorded on YBC 7289, a Babylonian clay tablet believed to belong to a student.

Notation and conventions
 3000 BC: The first deciphered numeral system is that of the Egyptian numerals, a sign-value system (as opposed to a place-value system).
 2000 BC: Primitive positional notation for numerals is seen in the Babylonian cuneiform numerals. However, the lack of clarity around the notion of zero made their system highly ambiguous (e.g.  would be written the same as ).

Astronomy
 Early 2nd millennium BC: The periodicity of planetary phenomenon is recognised by Babylonian astronomers.

Biology and anatomy
 Early 2nd millennium BC: Ancient Egyptians study anatomy, as recorded in the Edwin Smith Papyrus. They identified the heart and its vessels, liver, spleen, kidneys, hypothalamus, uterus, and bladder, and correctly identified that blood vessels emanated from the heart (however, they also believed that tears, urine, and semen, but not saliva and sweat, originated in the heart, see Cardiocentric hypothesis).

Iron Age

Mathematics

Geometry and trigonometry
 c. 700 BC: Pythagoras's theorem is discovered by Baudhayana in the Hindu Shulba Sutras in Upanishadic India. However, Indian mathematics, especially North Indian mathematics, generally did not have a tradition of communicating proofs, and it is not fully certain that Baudhayana or Apastamba knew of a proof.

Number theory and discrete mathematics
 c. 700 BC: Pell's equations are first studied by Baudhayana in India, the first diophantine equations known to be studied.

Geometry and trigonometry
 c. 600 BC: Thales of Miletus discovers Thales's theorem.

Biology and anatomy
 600 BC – 200 BC: The Sushruta Samhita shows an understanding of musculoskeletal structure (including joints, ligaments and muscles and their functions) (3.V). It refers to the cardiovascular system as a closed circuit. In (3.IX) it identifies the existence of nerves.

Social science

Linguistics
 c. 700 BC: Grammar is first studied in India (note that Sanskrit Vyākaraṇa predates Pāṇini).

500 BC – 1 BC
The Greeks make numerous advances in mathematics and astronomy through the Archaic, Classical and Hellenistic periods.

Mathematics

Logic and proof
 4th century BC: Greek philosophers study the properties of logical negation.
 4th century BC: The first true formal system is constructed by Pāṇini in his Sanskrit grammar. 
 c. 300 BC: Greek mathematician Euclid in the Elements describes a primitive form of formal proof and axiomatic systems. However, modern mathematicians generally believe that his axioms were highly incomplete, and that his definitions were not really used in his proofs.

Numbers, measurement and arithmetic
 4th century BC: Eudoxus of Cnidus states the Archimedean property.
 4th-3rd century BC: In Mauryan India, The Jain mathematical text Surya Prajnapati draws a distinction between countable and uncountable infinities.
 3rd century BC: Pingala in Mauryan India studies binary numbers, making him the first to study the radix (numerical base) in history.

Algebra
 5th century BC: Possible date of the discovery of the triangular numbers (i.e. the sum of consecutive integers), by the Pythagoreans.
 c. 300 BC: Finite geometric progressions are studied by Euclid in Ptolemaic Egypt.
 3rd century BC: Archimedes relates problems in geometric series to those in arithmetic series, foreshadowing the logarithm.
 190 BC: Magic squares appear in China. The theory of magic squares can be considered the first example of a vector space.
 165-142 BC: Zhang Cang in Northern China is credited with the development of Gaussian elimination.

Number theory and discrete mathematics
 c. 500 BC: Hippasus, a Pythagorean, discovers irrational numbers.
 4th century BC: Thaetetus shows that square roots are either integer or irrational.
 4th century BC: Thaetetus enumerates the Platonic solids, an early work in graph theory.
 3rd century BC: Pingala in Mauryan India describes the Fibonacci sequence.
 c. 300 BC: Euclid proves the infinitude of primes.
 c. 300 BC: Euclid proves the Fundamental Theorem of Arithmetic.
 c. 300 BC: Euclid discovers the Euclidean algorithm.
 3rd century BC: Pingala in Mauryan India discovers the binomial coefficients in a combinatorial context and the additive formula for generating them , i.e. a prose description of Pascal's triangle, and derived formulae relating to the sums and alternating sums of binomial coefficients. It has been suggested that he may have also discovered the binomial theorem in this context.
 3rd century BC: Eratosthenes discovers the Sieve of Eratosthenes.

Geometry and trigonometry
 5th century BC: The Greeks start experimenting with straightedge-and-compass constructions.
 4th century BC: Menaechmus discovers conic sections.
 4th century BC: Menaechmus develops co-ordinate geometry.
 c. 300 BC: Euclid publishes the Elements, a compendium on classical Euclidean geometry, including: elementary theorems on circles, definitions of the centers of a triangle, the tangent-secant theorem, the law of sines and the law of cosines.
 3rd century BC: Archimedes derives a formula for the volume of a sphere in The Method of Mechanical Theorems.
 3rd century BC: Archimedes calculates areas and volumes relating to conic sections, such as the area bounded between a parabola and a chord, and various volumes of revolution.
 3rd century BC: Archimedes discovers the sum/difference identity for trigonometric functions in the form of the "Theorem of Broken Chords".
 c. 200 BC: Apollonius of Perga discovers Apollonius's theorem.
 c. 200 BC: Apollonius of Perga assigns equations to curves.

Analysis
 Late 5th century BC: Antiphon discovers the method of exhaustion, foreshadowing the concept of a limit. 
 3rd century BC: Archimedes makes use of infinitesimals.
 3rd century BC: Archimedes further develops the method of exhaustion into an early description of integration.
 3rd century BC: Archimedes calculates tangents to non-trigonometric curves.

Numerical mathematics and algorithms
 3rd century BC: Archimedes uses the method of exhaustion to construct a strict inequality bounding the value of  within an interval of 0.002.

Physics

Astronomy
 5th century BC: The earliest documented mention of a spherical Earth comes from the Greeks in the 5th century BC.  It is known that the Indians modeled the Earth as spherical by 300 BC
 500 BC: Anaxagoras identifies moonlight as reflected sunlight.
 260 BC: Aristarchus of Samos proposes a basic heliocentric model of the universe.
 c. 200 BC: Apollonius of Perga develops epicycles. While an incorrect model, it was a precursor to the development of Fourier series.
 2nd century BC: Hipparchos discovers the apsidal precession of the Moon's orbit.
 2nd century BC: Hipparchos discovers Axial precession.

Mechanics
 3rd century BC: Archimedes develops the field of statics, introducing notions such as the center of gravity, mechanical equilibrium, the study of levers, and hydrostatics.
 350-50 BC: Clay tablets from (possibly Hellenistic-era) Babylon describe the mean speed theorem.

Optics
 4th century BC: Mozi in China gives a description of the camera obscura phenomenon.
 c. 300 BC: Euclid's Optics introduces the field of geometric optics, making basic considerations on the sizes of images.

Thermal physics
 460 BC: Empedocles describes thermal expansion.

Matter 

 600BC: Maharshi Kanada gives the ideal of the smallest units of matter. According to him, matter consisted of indestructible minutes particles called paramanus, which are now called as atoms.

Biology and anatomy
 4th century BC: Around the time of Aristotle, a more empirically founded system of anatomy is established, based on animal dissection. In particular, Praxagoras makes the distinction between arteries and veins.
 4th century BC: Aristotle differentiates between near-sighted and far-sightedness. Graeco-Roman physician Galen would later use the term "myopia" for near-sightedness.

Social science

Economics
 Late 4th century BC: Chanakya (also known as Kautilya) establishes the field of economics with the Arthashastra (literally "Science of wealth"), a prescriptive treatise on economics and statecraft for Mauryan India.

Linguistics
 4th century BC: Pāṇini develops a full-fledged formal grammar (for Sanskrit).

Astronomical and geospatial measurements
 3rd century BC: Eratosthenes measures the circumference of the Earth. 
 2nd century BC: Hipparchos measures the sizes of and distances to the moon and sun.

1 AD – 500 AD
Mathematics and astronomy flourish during the Golden Age of India (4th to 6th centuries AD) under the Gupta Empire. Meanwhile, Greece and its colonies have entered the Roman period in the last few decades of the preceding millennium, and Greek science is negatively impacted by the Fall of the Western Roman Empire and the economic decline that follows.

Mathematics

Numbers, measurement and arithmetic

 210 AD: Negative numbers are accepted as numeric by the late Han-era Chinese text The Nine Chapters on the Mathematical Art. Later, Liu Hui of Cao Wei (during the Three Kingdoms period) writes down laws regarding the arithmetic of negative numbers.
 499 AD: Aryabhata gives a new symbol for zero and uses it for the decimal system

Algebra
 499 AD: Aryabhata discovers the formula for the square-pyramidal numbers (the sums of consecutive square numbers).
 499 AD: Aryabhata discovers the formula for the simplicial numbers (the sums of consecutive cube numbers).

Number theory and discrete mathematics
 3rd century AD: Diophantus discusses linear diophantine equations.
 499 AD: Aryabhata discovers Bezout's identity, a foundational result to the theory of principal ideal domains.
 499 AD: Aryabhata develops Kuṭṭaka, an algorithm very similar to the Extended Euclidean algorithm.

Geometry and trigonometry
 c. 60 AD: Heron's formula is discovered by Hero of Alexandria.
 c. 100 AD: Menelaus of Alexandria describes spherical triangles, a precursor to non-Euclidean geometry.
 4th to 5th centuries: The modern fundamental trigonometric functions, sine and cosine, are described in the Siddhantas of India. This formulation of trigonometry is an improvement over the earlier Greek functions, in that it lends itself more seamlessly to polar co-ordinates and the later complex interpretation of the trigonometric functions.

Numerical mathematics and algorithms
 By the 4th century AD: a square root finding algorithm with quartic convergence, known as the Bakhshali method (after the Bakhshali manuscript which records it), is discovered in India.
 499 AD: Aryabhata describes a numerical algorithm for finding cube roots.
 499 AD: Aryabhata develops an algorithm to solve the Chinese remainder theorem.
 1st to 4th century AD: A precursor to long division, known as "galley division" is developed at some point. Its discovery is generally believed to have originated in India around the 4th century AD, although Singaporean mathematician Lam Lay Yong claims that the method is found in the Chinese text The Nine Chapters on the Mathematical Art, from the 1st century AD.

Notation and conventions

 c. 150 AD: The Almagest of Ptolemy contains evidence of the Hellenistic zero. Unlike the earlier Babylonian zero, the Hellenistic zero could be used alone, or at the end of a number. However, it was usually used in the fractional part of a numeral, and was not regarded as a true arithmetical number itself.
 3rd century AD: Diophantus uses a primitive form of algebraic symbolism, which is quickly forgotten.
 By the 4th century AD: The present Hindu–Arabic numeral system with place-value numerals develops in Gupta-era India, and is attested in the Bakhshali Manuscript of Gandhara. The superiority of the system over existing place-value and sign-value systems arises from its treatment of zero as an ordinary numeral.
 By the 5th century AD: The decimal separator is developed in India, as recorded in al-Uqlidisi's later commentary on Indian mathematics.
 By 499 AD: Aryabhata's work shows the use of the modern fraction notation, known as bhinnarasi.

Physics

Astronomy
 c. 150 AD: Ptolemy's Almagest contains practical formulae to calculate latitudes and day lengths.
 2nd century AD: Ptolemy formalises the epicycles of Apollonius.
 By the 5th century AD: The elliptical orbits of planets are discovered in India by at least the time of Aryabhata, and are used for the calculations of orbital periods and eclipse timings.
 499 AD: Historians speculate that Aryabhata may have used an underlying heliocentric model for his astronomical calculations, which would make it the first computational heliocentric model in history (as opposed to Aristarchus's model in form). This claim is based on his description of the planetary period about the sun (śīghrocca), but has been met with criticism.

Optics
 2nd century - Ptolemy publishes his Optics, discussing colour, reflection, and refraction of light, and including the first known table of refractive angles.

Biology and human anatomy
 2nd century AD: Galen studies the anatomy of pigs.

Astronomical and geospatial measurements
 499 AD: Aryabhata creates a particularly accurate eclipse chart. As an example of its accuracy, 18th century scientist Guillaume Le Gentil, during a visit to Pondicherry, India, found the Indian computations (based on Aryabhata's computational paradigm) of the duration of the lunar eclipse of 30 August 1765 to be short by 41 seconds, whereas his charts (by Tobias Mayer, 1752) were long by 68 seconds.

500 AD – 1000 AD

The Golden Age of Indian mathematics and astronomy continues after the end of the Gupta empire, especially in Southern India during the era of the Rashtrakuta, Western Chalukya and Vijayanagara empires of Karnataka, which variously patronised Hindu and Jain mathematicians. In addition, the Middle East enters the Islamic Golden Age through contact with other civilisations, and China enters a golden period during the Tang and Song dynasties.

Mathematics

Numbers, measurement and arithmetic
 628 AD: Brahmagupta states the arithmetic rules for addition, subtraction, and multiplication with zero, as well as the multiplication of negative numbers, extending the basic rules for the latter found in the earlier The Nine Chapters on the Mathematical Art.

Algebra
 628 AD: Brahmagupta provides an explicit solution to the quadratic equation.
 9th century AD: Jain mathematician Mahāvīra writes down a factorisation for the difference of cubes.

Number theory and discrete mathematics
 628 AD: Brahmagupta writes down Brahmagupta's identity, an important lemma in the theory of Pell's equation.
 628 AD: Brahmagupta produces an infinite (but not exhaustive) number of solutions to Pell's equation.
 c. 850 AD: Mahāvīra derives the expression for the binomial coefficient in terms of factorials, .
 c. 975 AD: Halayudha organizes the binomial coefficients into a triangle, i.e. Pascal's triangle.

Geometry and trigonometry
 628 AD: Brahmagupta discovers Brahmagupta's formula, a generalization of Heron's formula to cyclic quadrilaterals.

Analysis
 10th century AD: Manjula in India discovers the derivative, deducing that the derivative of the sine function is the cosine.

Numerical mathematics and algorithms
 628 AD: Brahmagupta discovers second-order interpolation, in the form of Brahmagupta's interpolation formula.
 629 AD: Bhāskara I produces the first approximation of a transcendental function with a rational function, in the sine approximation formula that bears his name.
 816 AD: Jain mathematician Virasena describes the integer logarithm.
 9th century AD: Algorisms (arithmetical algorithms on numbers written in place-value system) are described by al-Khwarizmi in his kitāb al-ḥisāb al-hindī (Book of Indian computation) and kitab al-jam' wa'l-tafriq al-ḥisāb al-hindī (Addition and subtraction in Indian arithmetic).
 9th century AD: Mahāvīra discovers the first algorithm for writing fractions as Egyptian fractions, which is in fact a slightly more general form of the Greedy algorithm for Egyptian fractions.

Notation and conventions
 628 AD: Brahmagupta invents a symbolic mathematical notation, which is then adopted by mathematicians through India and the Near East, and eventually Europe.

Physics

Astronomy
 6th century AD: Varahamira in the Gupta empire is the first to describe comets as astronomical phenomena, and as periodic in nature.

Mechanics
 c. 525 AD: John Philoponus in Byzantine Egypt describes the notion of inertia, and states that the motion of a falling object does not depend on its weight. His radical rejection of Aristotlean orthodoxy lead him to be ignored in his time.

Optics
 984 AD: Ibn Sahl discovers Snell's law.

Astronomical and geospatial measurements
 10th century AD: Kashmiri astronomer Bhaṭṭotpala lists names and estimates periods of certain comets.

1000 AD – 1500 AD

Mathematics

Algebra
 11th century: Alhazen discovers the formula for the simplicial numbers defined as the sums of consecutive quartic powers.

Number theory and discrete mathematics
 c. 1000 AD: al-Karaji uses mathematical induction.
 12th century AD: Bhāskara II develops the Chakravala method, solving Pell's equation.

Geometry and trigonometry
 15th century: Parameshvara discovers a formula for the circumradius of a quadrilateral.

Analysis
 1380 AD: Madhava of Sangamagrama discovers continued fractions and uses them to solve transcendental equations.
 1380 AD: The Kerala school develops convergence tests for infinite series.

Numerical mathematics and algorithms
 12th century AD: al-Tusi develops a numerical algorithm to solve cubic equations.
 1380 AD: Madhava of Sangamagrama solves transcendental equations by iteration.
 1480 AD: Madhava of Sangamagrama found pi and that it was infinite.

Physics

Astronomy
 1058 AD: al-Zarqālī in Islamic Spain discovers the apsidal precession of the sun.
 c. 1500 AD: Nilakantha Somayaji develops a model similar to the Tychonic system. His model has been described as mathematically more efficient than the Tychonic system due to correctly considering the equation of the centre and latitudinal motion of Mercury and Venus.

Mechanics
 12th century AD: Jewish polymath Baruch ben Malka in Iraq formulates a qualitative form of Newton's second law for constant forces.

Optics
 11th century: Alhazen systematically studies optics and refraction, which would later be important in making the connection between geometric (ray) optics and wave theory.
 11th century: Shen Kuo discovers atmospheric refraction and provides the correct explanation of rainbow phenomenon
 c1290 - Eyeglasses are invented in Northern Italy, possibly Pisa, demonstrating knowledge of human biology and optics, to offer bespoke works that compensate for an individual human disability.

Astronomical and geospatial measurements
 11th century: Shen Kuo discovers the concepts of true north and magnetic declination. 
 11th century: Shen Kuo develops the field of geomorphology and natural climate change.

Social science

Economics
 1295 AD: Scottish priest Duns Scotus writes about the mutual beneficence of trade.
 14th century AD: French priest Jean Buridan provides a basic explanation of the price system.

Philosophy of science
 1220s - Robert Grosseteste writes on optics, and the production of lenses, while asserting models should be developed from observations, and predictions of those models verified through observation, in a precursor to the scientific method.
 1267 - Roger Bacon publishes his Opus Majus, compiling translated Classical Greek, and Arabic works on mathematics, optics, and alchemy into a volume, and details his methods for evaluating the theories, particularly those of Ptolemy's 2nd century Optics, and his findings on the production of lenses, asserting  “theories supplied by reason should be verified by sensory data, aided by instruments, and corroborated by trustworthy witnesses", in a precursor to the peer reviewed scientific method.

16th century
The Scientific Revolution occurs in Europe around this period, greatly accelerating the progress of science and contributing to the rationalization of the natural sciences.

Mathematics

Numbers, measurement and arithmetic
 1545: Gerolamo Cardano discovers complex numbers.
 1572: Rafael Bombelli provides rules for complex arithmetic.

Algebra
 c. 1500: Scipione del Ferro solves the special cubic equation .
 16th century: Gerolamo Cardano solves the general cubic equation (by reducing them to the case with zero quadratic term).
 16th century: Lodovico Ferrari solves the general quartic equation (by reducing it to the case with zero quartic term).
 16th century: François Viète discovers Vieta's formulas.

Probability and statistics
 1564: Gerolamo Cardano is the first to produce a systematic treatment of probability.

Numerical mathematics and algorithms

Notation and conventions
Various pieces of modern symbolic notation were introduced in this period, notably: 
 1556: Niccolò Tartaglia introduces parenthesis.
 1557: Robert Recorde introduces the equal sign.
 1591: François Viète's New algebra shows the modern notational algebraic manipulation.

Physics

Astronomy
 1543: Nicolaus Copernicus develops a heliocentric model, rejecting Aristotle's earth-centric view, would be the first quantitative heliocentric model in history.
 Late 16th century: Tycho Brahe proves that comets are astronomical (and not atmospheric) phenomena.

Biology and anatomy
 1543 – Vesalius: pioneering research into human anatomy

Social science

Economics
 1517: Nicolaus Copernicus develops the quantity theory of money and states the earliest known form of Gresham's law: ("Bad money drowns out good").

17th century
 1600 – William Gilbert: Earth's magnetic field
 1608 – Earliest record of an optical telescope
 1609 – Johannes Kepler: first two laws of planetary motion
 1610 – Galileo Galilei: Sidereus Nuncius: telescopic observations
 1614 – John Napier: use of logarithms for calculation
 1619 – Johannes Kepler: third law of planetary motion
 1620 – Appearance of the first compound microscopes in Europe
 1628 – Willebrord Snellius: the law of refraction also known as Snell's law
 1628 – William Harvey: blood circulation
 1638 – Galileo Galilei: laws of falling bodies
 1643 – Evangelista Torricelli invents the mercury barometer
 1662 – Robert Boyle: Boyle's law of ideal gases
 1665 – Philosophical Transactions of the Royal Society: first peer reviewed scientific journal published.
 1665 – Robert Hooke: discovers the cell
 1668 – Francesco Redi: disproved idea of spontaneous generation
 1669 – Nicholas Steno: proposes that fossils are organic remains embedded in layers of sediment, basis of stratigraphy
 1669 – Jan Swammerdam: epigenesis in insects
 1672 – Sir Isaac Newton: discovers that white light is a mixture of distinct coloured rays (the spectrum)
 1673 – Christiaan Huygens: first study of oscillating system and design of pendulum clocks
 1675 – Leibniz, Newton: infinitesimal calculus
 1675 – Anton van Leeuwenhoek: observes microorganisms using a refined simple microscope
 1676 – Ole Rømer:  first measurement of the speed of light
 1687 – Sir Isaac Newton: classical mathematical description of the fundamental force of universal gravitation and the three physical laws of motion

18th century
 1735 – Carl Linnaeus described a new system for classifying plants in Systema Naturae
 1745 – Ewald Georg von Kleist first capacitor, the Leyden jar
 1749–1789 - Buffon wrote Histoire naturelle
 1750 – Joseph Black: describes latent heat
 1751 – Benjamin Franklin: lightning is electrical
 1755 – Immanuel Kant: Gaseous Hypothesis in Universal Natural History and Theory of Heaven
 1761 – Mikhail Lomonosov: discovery of the atmosphere of Venus
 1763 – Thomas Bayes: publishes the first version of Bayes' theorem, paving the way for Bayesian probability
 1771 – Charles Messier: publishes catalogue of astronomical objects (Messier Objects) now known to include galaxies, star clusters, and nebulae.
 1778 – Antoine Lavoisier (and Joseph Priestley): discovery of oxygen leading to end of Phlogiston theory
 1781 – William Herschel announces discovery of Uranus, expanding the known boundaries of the Solar System for the first time in modern history
 1785 – William Withering: publishes the first definitive account of the use of foxglove (digitalis) for treating dropsy
 1787 – Jacques Charles: Charles's law of ideal gases
 1789 – Antoine Lavoisier: law of conservation of mass, basis for chemistry, and the beginning of modern chemistry
 1796 – Georges Cuvier: Establishes extinction as a fact
 1796 – Edward Jenner: smallpox historical accounting
 1796 – Hanaoka Seishū: develops general anaesthesia
 1800 – Alessandro Volta: discovers electrochemical series and invents the battery

1800–1849
 1802 – Jean-Baptiste Lamarck: teleological evolution
 1805 – John Dalton: Atomic Theory in (chemistry)
 1820 – Hans Christian Ørsted discovers that a current passed through a wire will deflect the needle of a compass, establishing the deep relationship between electricity and magnetism (electromagnetism).
 1820 - Michael Faraday and James Stoddart discover alloying iron with chromium produces a stainless steel resistant to oxidising elements (rust).
 1821 – Thomas Johann Seebeck is the first to observe a property of semiconductors
 1824 – Carnot: described the Carnot cycle, the idealized heat engine
 1824 - Joseph Aspdin develops Portland cement (concrete), by heating ground limestone, clay and gypsum, in a kiln.
 1827 – Evariste Galois development of group theory
 1827 – Georg Ohm: Ohm's law (Electricity)
 1827 – Amedeo Avogadro: Avogadro's law (Gas law)
 1828 – Friedrich Wöhler synthesized urea, refuting vitalism
 1830 – Nikolai Lobachevsky created Non-Euclidean geometry
 1831 – Michael Faraday discovers electromagnetic induction
 1833 – Anselme Payen isolates first enzyme, diastase
 1837 - Charles Babbage proposes a design for the construction of a Turing complete, general purpose Computer, to be called the Analytical Engine.
 1838 – Matthias Schleiden: all plants are made of cells
 1838 – Friedrich Bessel: first successful measure of stellar parallax (to star 61 Cygni)
 1842 – Christian Doppler: Doppler effect
 1843 – James Prescott Joule: Law of Conservation of energy (First law of thermodynamics), also 1847 – Helmholtz, Conservation of energy
 1846 – Johann Gottfried Galle and Heinrich Louis d'Arrest: discovery of Neptune
 1847 - George Boole: publishes The Mathematical Analysis of Logic, defining Boolean algebra; refined in his 1854 The Laws of Thought. 
 1848 – Lord Kelvin: absolute zero

1850–1899
 1856 - Robert Forester Mushet develops a process for the decarbonisation, and re-carbonisation of iron, thorough the addition of a calculated quantity of spiegeleisen, to produce cheap, consistently high quality steel.
 1858 – Rudolf Virchow: cells can only arise from pre-existing cells
 1859 – Charles Darwin and Alfred Wallace: Theory of evolution by natural selection
 1861 – Louis Pasteur: Germ theory
 1861 – John Tyndall:  Experiments in Radiant Energy that reinforced the Greenhouse effect
 1864 – James Clerk Maxwell: Theory of electromagnetism
 1865 – Gregor Mendel: Mendel's laws of inheritance, basis for genetics
 1865 – Rudolf Clausius: Definition of entropy
 1868 - Robert Forester Mushet discovers that alloying steel with tungsten produces a harder, more durable alloy. 
 1869 – Dmitri Mendeleev: Periodic table
 1871 – Lord Rayleigh: Diffuse sky radiation (Rayleigh scattering) explains why sky appears blue
 1873 – Johannes Diderik van der Waals: was one of the first to postulate an intermolecular force: the van der Waals force.
 1873 – Frederick Guthrie discovers thermionic emission.
 1873 – Willoughby Smith discovers photoconductivity.
 1875 – William Crookes invented the Crookes tube and studied cathode rays
 1876 – Josiah Willard Gibbs founded chemical thermodynamics, the phase rule
 1877 – Ludwig Boltzmann: Statistical definition of entropy
 1880s - John Hopkinson develops three-phase electrical supplies, mathematically proves how multiple AC dynamos can be connected in parallel, improves permanent magnets, and dynamo efficiency, by the addition of tungsten, and describes how temperature effects magnetism (Hopkinson effect).
 1880 – Pierre Curie and Jacques Curie: Piezoelectricity
 1884 – Jacobus Henricus van 't Hoff: discovered the laws of chemical dynamics and osmotic pressure in solutions (in his work "Études de dynamique chimique").
 1887 – Albert A. Michelson and Edward W. Morley: Michelson–Morley experiment which showed a lack of evidence for the aether
 1888 – Friedrich Reinitzer discovers liquid crystals
 1892 – Dmitri Ivanovsky discovers viruses
 1895 – Wilhelm Conrad Röntgen discovers x-rays
 1896 – Henri Becquerel discovers radioactivity
 1896 – Svante Arrhenius derives the basic principles of the greenhouse effect
 1897 – J.J. Thomson discovers the electron in cathode rays
 1898 – Martinus Beijerinck: concluded that a virus is infectious—replicating in the host—and thus not a mere toxin, and gave it the name "virus"
 1898 – J.J. Thomson proposed the plum pudding model of an atom
1898 - Marie Curie discovered radium and polonium

1900–1949
 1900 – Max Planck: explains the emission spectrum of a black body
 1905 – Albert Einstein: theory of special relativity, explanation of Brownian motion, and photoelectric effect
 1906 – Walther Nernst: Third law of thermodynamics
 1907 – Alfred Bertheim: Arsphenamine, the first modern chemotherapeutic agent
 1909 – Fritz Haber: Haber Process for industrial production of ammonia
 1909 – Robert Andrews Millikan: conducts the oil drop experiment and determines the charge on an electron
 1910 – Williamina Fleming: the first white dwarf, 40 Eridani B
 1911 – Ernest Rutherford: Atomic nucleus
 1911 – Heike Kamerlingh Onnes: Superconductivity
 1912 – Alfred Wegener: Continental drift
 1912 – Max von Laue : x-ray diffraction
 1912 – Vesto Slipher : galactic redshifts
 1912 – Henrietta Swan Leavitt: Cepheid variable period-luminosity relation
 1913 – Henry Moseley: defined atomic number
 1913 – Niels Bohr: Model of the atom
 1915 – Albert Einstein: theory of general relativity – also David Hilbert
 1915 – Karl Schwarzschild: discovery of the Schwarzschild radius leading to the identification of black holes
 1918 – Emmy Noether: Noether's theorem – conditions under which the conservation laws are valid
 1920 – Arthur Eddington: Stellar nucleosynthesis
 1922 – Frederick Banting, Charles Best, James Collip, John Macleod: isolation and production of insulin to control diabetes
 1924 – Wolfgang Pauli: quantum Pauli exclusion principle
 1924 – Edwin Hubble: the discovery that the Milky Way is just one of many galaxies
 1925 – Erwin Schrödinger: Schrödinger equation (Quantum mechanics)
 1925 – Cecilia Payne-Gaposchkin: Discovery of the composition of the Sun and that hydrogen is the most abundant element in the Universe
 1927 – Werner Heisenberg: Uncertainty principle (Quantum mechanics)
 1927 – Georges Lemaître: Theory of the Big Bang
 1928 – Paul Dirac: Dirac equation (Quantum mechanics)
 1929 – Edwin Hubble: Hubble's law of the expanding universe
 1929 – Alexander Fleming: Penicillin, the first beta-lactam antibiotic
 1929 – Lars Onsager's reciprocal relations, a potential fourth law of thermodynamics
 1930 – Subrahmanyan Chandrasekhar discovers his eponymous limit of the maximum mass of a white dwarf star
 1931 – Kurt Gödel: incompleteness theorems prove formal axiomatic systems are incomplete
 1932 – James Chadwick: Discovery of the neutron
 1932 – Karl Guthe Jansky discovers the first astronomical radio source, Sagittarius A
 1932 – Ernest Walton and John Cockcroft: Nuclear fission by proton bombardment
 1934 – Enrico Fermi: Nuclear fission by neutron irradiation
 1934 – Clive McCay: Calorie restriction extends the maximum lifespan of another species
 1938 – Otto Hahn, Lise Meitner and Fritz Strassmann: Nuclear fission of heavy nuclei 
 1938 – Isidor Rabi: Nuclear magnetic resonance
 1943 – Oswald Avery proves that DNA is the genetic material of the chromosome
 1945 – Howard Florey Mass production of penicillin 
 1947 – William Shockley, John Bardeen and Walter Brattain invent the first transistor
 1948 – Claude Elwood Shannon: 'A mathematical theory of communication' a seminal paper in Information theory.
 1948 – Richard Feynman, Julian Schwinger, Sin-Itiro Tomonaga and Freeman Dyson: Quantum electrodynamics

1950–1999
 1951 – George Otto Gey propagates first cancer cell line, HeLa
 1952 – Jonas Salk: developed and tested first polio vaccine
 1952 – Stanley Miller: demonstrated that the building blocks of life could arise from primeval soup in the conditions present during early earth (Miller-Urey experiment)
 1952 – Frederick Sanger: demonstrated that proteins are sequences of amino acids
 1953 – James Watson, Francis Crick, Maurice Wilkins and Rosalind Franklin: helical structure of DNA, basis for molecular biology
 1957 - Chien Shiung Wu: demonstrated that parity, and thus charge conjugation and time-reversals, are violated for weak interactions
 1962 – Riccardo Giacconi and his team discover the first cosmic x-ray source, Scorpius X-1
 1963 – Lawrence Morley, Fred Vine, and Drummond Matthews:  Paleomagnetic stripes in ocean crust as evidence of plate tectonics (Vine–Matthews–Morley hypothesis).
 1964 – Murray Gell-Mann and George Zweig: postulates quarks, leading to the standard model
 1964 – Arno Penzias and Robert Woodrow Wilson: detection of CMBR providing experimental evidence for the Big Bang
 1965 – Leonard Hayflick: normal cells divide only a certain number of times: the Hayflick limit
 1967 – Jocelyn Bell Burnell and Antony Hewish discover first pulsar
 1967 – Vela nuclear test detection satellites discover the first gamma-ray burst
 1970 - James H. Ellis proposed the possibility of "non-secret encryption", more commonly termed public-key cryptography, a concept that would be implemented by his GCHQ colleague Clifford Cocks in 1973, in what would become known as the RSA algorithm, with key exchange added by a third colleague Malcolm J. Williamson, in 1975.
 1971 – Place cells in the brain are discovered by John O'Keefe
 1974 – Russell Alan Hulse and Joseph Hooton Taylor, Jr. discover indirect evidence for gravitational wave radiation in the Hulse–Taylor binary
 1977 – Frederick Sanger sequences the first DNA genome of an organism using Sanger sequencing
 1980 – Klaus von Klitzing discovered the quantum Hall effect
 1982 – Donald C. Backer et al. discover the first millisecond pulsar
 1983 – Kary Mullis invents the polymerase chain reaction, a key discovery in molecular biology
 1986 – Karl Müller and Johannes Bednorz: Discovery of High-temperature superconductivity
 1988 –   and colleagues at TU Deflt and Philips Research discovered the quantized conductance in a two-dimensional electron gas.
 1992 – Aleksander Wolszczan and Dale Frail observe the first pulsar planets (this was the first confirmed discovery of planets outside the Solar System)
 1994 – Andrew Wiles proves Fermat's Last Theorem
 1995 – Michel Mayor and Didier Queloz definitively observe the first extrasolar planet around a main sequence star
 1995 – Eric Cornell, Carl Wieman and Wolfgang Ketterle attained the first Bose-Einstein Condensate with atomic gases, so called fifth state of matter at an extremely low temperature.
 1996 – Roslin Institute: Dolly the sheep was cloned.
 1997 – CDF and DØ experiments at Fermilab: Top quark.
 1998 – Supernova Cosmology Project and the High-Z Supernova Search Team: discovery of the accelerated expansion of the Universe and dark energy
 2000 – The Tau neutrino is discovered by the DONUT collaboration

21st century

 2001 – The first draft of the Human Genome Project is published.
 2003 – Grigori Perelman presents proof of the Poincaré Conjecture.
 2004 – Andre Geim and Konstantin Novoselov isolated graphene, a monolayer of carbon atoms, and studied its quantum electrical properties.
 2005 – Grid cells in the brain are discovered by Edvard Moser and May-Britt Moser.
 2010 – The first self-replicating, synthetic bacterial cells are constructed.
 2010 – The Neanderthal Genome Project presented preliminary genetic evidence that interbreeding did likely take place and that a small but significant portion of Neanderthal admixture is present in modern non-African populations.
 2012 – Higgs boson is discovered at CERN (confirmed to 99.999% certainty)
 2012 – Photonic molecules are discovered at MIT
 2014 – Exotic hadrons are discovered at the LHCb
 2014 – Photonic metamaterials are discovered to make passive daytime radiative cooling possible by Raman et al.
 2016 – The LIGO team detected gravitational waves from a black hole merger
 2017 – Gravitational wave signal GW170817 was observed by the LIGO/Virgo collaboration. This was the first instance of a gravitational wave event that was observed to have a simultaneous electromagnetic signal when space telescopes like Hubble observed lights coming from the event, thereby marking a significant breakthrough for multi-messenger astronomy.
2019 – The first ever image of a black hole was captured, using eight different telescopes taking simultaneous pictures, timed with extremely precise atomic clocks.
2020 – NASA and SOFIA (Stratospheric Observatory for Infrared Astronomy) discovered about 12oz of surface water in one of the moon's largest visible craters.

References

External links
 Science Timeline

Scientific discoveries
Discoveries
Lists of inventions or discoveries